Almario is a surname. Notable people with the surname include:

Alfie Almario (1963–2001), Filipino basketball player
Justo Almario (born 1949), Colombian musician
Mario Almario (born 1934), Filipino sailor
Rosauro Almario, Filipino writer
Virgilio S. Almario, Filipino artist